These are the full results of the 2016 Asian Indoor Athletics Championships which took place between 19 and 21 February 2016 in Doha, Qatar.

Men's results

60 meters

Heats – 19 February

Semifinals – 19 February

Final – 19 February

400 meters

Heats – 19 February

Semifinals – 19 February

Final – 20 February

800 meters

Heats – 19 February

Final – 21 February

1500 meters
20 February

3000 meters
21 February

60 meters hurdles

Heats – 20 February

Final – 21 February

4 x 400 meters relay
21 February

High jump
19 February

Pole vault
20 February

Long jump
21 February

Triple jump
20 February

Shot put
21 February

Heptathlon
20–21 February

Women's results

60 meters

Heats – 19 February

Semifinals – 19 February

Final – 19 February

400 meters

Heats – 19 February

Final – 20 February

800 meters

Heats – 19 February

Final – 21 February

1500 meters
19 February

3000 meters
20 February

60 meters hurdles

Heats – 20 February

Final – 21 February

4 x 400 meters relay
21 February

High jump
21 February

Pole vault
19 February

Long jump
19 February

Triple jump
20 February

Shot put
19 February

Pentathlon
21 February

References

Asian Indoor Championships Results
Events at the Asian Indoor Athletics Championships